Stadio Città di Gorgonzola is a multi-use stadium in Gorgonzola, Italy.  It is currently used mostly for football matches and is the home ground of Giana Erminio. The stadium holds 3,766.

Gallery

External links
Stadio Città di Gorgonzola at Soccerway.com

Città di Gorgonzola
Sports venues in Milan